"Surfer King" is Fujifabric's 8th single. The single's title track features Masahiko Kitahara, Nargo, and Gamou from Tokyo Ska Paradise Orchestra, and marks Fujifabric's first collaboration.

Track listing
Surfer King
Day Dripper

Chart positions

2007 singles
2007 songs
Capitol Records singles